Noël is an American disco music singer who released an album and several singles on Virgin Records at the end of the 1970s.

Noël was a Los Angeles-based model-turned-singer who was promoted by brothers Ron and Russell Mael of the band Sparks. Her real-life identity has not publicly been revealed.

Discography
Singles
 "Dancing Is Dangerous" / B-side : "I Want A Man" (1979)
 "The Night They Invented Love" / B-side : "Au Revoir". Both written by Ron Mael and Russell Mael. (1979)
 "Special to You" / B-side : "Lovemaker" (as Noël & The Red Wedge, 1982)

Albums
 Is There More To Life Than Dancing? (1979)
 Peer Pressure (credited to Noël & The Red Wedge, 1982)

References

American women pop singers
Possibly living people
Year of birth missing